The Kobe Anpanman Children's Museum & Mall  (神戸アンパンマンこどもミュージアム＆モール) is an interactive children's museum located in Kobe, Japan dedicated to Takashi Yanase's popular Anpanman franchise. It is one of three such complexes in the country (the others being in Yokohama, Sendai and Nagoya), and also the newest, having been opened in 2013.

External links
  

Buildings and structures in Kobe
Anpanman
Shopping malls established in 2013